Beust is a surname. Notable people with the surname include:

Friedrich Beust (1817–1899), German soldier and political activist and Swiss reform pedagogue
Friedrich Ferdinand von Beust (1809–1886), German and Austrian statesman
Hans-Henning Freiherr von Beust (1913–1991), highly decorated Oberst in the Luftwaffe during World War II
Ole von Beust (born 1955), German politician, First Mayor of Hamburg, President of the Bundesrat for one year

See also
Beussent
Beuste
Beuster
Breust
Bust (disambiguation)